Josefa Butteau (1753-1815) was a stage actress and ballet dancer.

She was from 1771 married to the actor and dancer Jean Butteau, and the mother of Katharina Butteau. She was engaged as a ballet- and pantomime dancer in the Vienna Ballet, in the Kotcích Theater in Prague in 1778, and at the Estates Theatre in 1783, and as an actor at the Czech language Vlastenské Theatre in 1790-92 and at the Estates Theatre from 1798 onward. As an actor she was mostly known for her roles as confidantes.

References 

 Starší divadlo v českých zemích do konce 18. století. Osobnosti a díla, ed. A. Jakubcová, Praha: Divadelní ústav – Academia 2007
 http://encyklopedie.idu.cz/index.php/Butteau,_Josefa

1753 births
1815 deaths
18th-century Bohemian actresses
18th-century actresses
18th-century Bohemian ballet dancers
Actresses from the Austrian Empire
Ballerinas from the Austrian Empire